This is a list of all the United States Supreme Court cases from volume 317 of the United States Reports:

External links

1943 in United States case law
1942 in United States case law